Underworld Unleashed was a multi-title American comic book crossover event released by DC Comics in 1995. 

The main theme of Underworld Unleashed involved the new ruler of Hell, a demon-lord named Neron, offering first many of the DC Universe supervillains and then a number of the DC Universe superheroes various deals in exchange for their souls.

Plot
Neron dupes five of the Rogues who typically battle the Flash: Captain Boomerang I, Captain Cold, Heat Wave I, the Mirror Master III, and the Weather Wizard. He promises them a chance to go down in history as five of the greatest villains if they each engage in a specific destructive act. He does not tell them that it will cost them their lives and unleash him onto the Earth. Lex Luthor, the Joker, Circe I, Doctor Polaris I and Abra Kadabra become his Inner Council.

Neron sends magical candles to many supervillains. When they are all lit, they transport the villains to Neron's underworld realm. Many villains accept his offer, but some do not. The newly empowered villains are sent back to Earth to wreak havoc while Neron turns his attention to the superheroes. Along the way, the Trickster I comes to Neron, but does not make a deal with him. Instead, he helps Neron betray his Inner Council.

When the heroes come to Neron's realm looking to defeat him, they are corrupted by the influences of that realm. Trickster works out how Neron can be stopped, and instructs Captain Marvel to beat Neron at his own game by offering the demon his soul for purely selfless reasons. Unable to even touch the offer, Neron's work is reversed: breaking that one deal also broke all his others.

Collected editions 
 The three-issue miniseries Underworld Unleashed, together with the one-shot issue Underworld Unleashed: Abyss - Hell's Sentinel #1, was collected as a trade paperback called Underworld Unleashed (DC Comics, March 1998, 158 pages).
 In 2020, a new hardcover graphic novel, Underworld Unleashed: The 25th Anniversary Edition, was published, containing the three-issue miniseries plus the four one-shot issues Underworld Unleashed: Abyss - Hell's Sentinel #1, Underworld Unleashed: Apokolips - Dark Uprising #1, Underworld Unleashed: Batman - Devil's Asylum #1 and Underworld Unleashed: Patterns of Fear #1 (DC Comics, November 2020, 304 pp.)).

References

External links
 Underworld Unleashed at DC wikia
 Underworld Unleashed at DCU Guide

1995 comics debuts
DC Comics limited series
DC Comics titles
Comics by Mark Waid